The 2019 Pocono Green 250 is a NASCAR Xfinity Series race held on June 1, 2019, at Pocono Raceway in Long Pond, Pennsylvania. Contested over 103 laps (extended from 100 laps due to an overtime finish) on the  triangular racecourse, it was the 12th race of the 2019 NASCAR Xfinity Series season.

Background

Track

The race was held at Pocono Raceway which is located in the Pocono Mountains in Long Pond, Pennsylvania. It is the site of two annual Monster Energy NASCAR Cup Series races held several weeks apart in early June and late July, one NASCAR Xfinity Series event in early June, one NASCAR Gander Outdoors Truck Series event in late July, and two ARCA Racing Series events, one in early June and the other in late July.  From 1971 to 1989, and since 2013, the track has also hosted an Indy Car race, currently sanctioned by the IndyCar Series and run in August.

Entry list

Initially No. 5 from Matt Mills was a Chevrolet but he crashed the car in Practice, so they ran the backup car that was a Toyota.

Practice

First practice

Final practice

Qualifying

Qualifying results

Tyler Reddick and John Hunter Nemechek started from the rear due to transmission failure and starting on a backup car, respectively.

Race

Summary
Cole Custer started on pole and led from green flag to the end of stage 1. Brandon Jones spun out early, slamming the back of his car into the fence on turn 1. Joey Gase, Chad Finchum, and Todd Peck all got together exiting the first turn afterwards, and Christopher Bell spun out but managed to save it.

Bell led for a few laps before Justin Allgaier passed him to win stage 2. Allgaier would later lose the lead after Custer passed him the same way he passed Bell in turn 1. Jeffrey Earnhardt spun out after being tapped by Austin Cindric.

Tyler Reddick passed Custer after the final restart, leading a lap. On the final turn, Custer managed to slip by Reddick (who got loose) and held him off to win the race.

Stage Results

Stage One
Laps: 25

Stage Two
Laps: 25

Final Stage Results

Stage Three
Laps: 50

References

2019 in sports in Pennsylvania
Pocono Green 250
NASCAR races at Pocono Raceway
2019 NASCAR Xfinity Series